Fabián Gómez (born 27 October 1978) is an Argentine professional golfer who has played on a number of the world's golf tours including the PGA Tour, Nationwide Tour, PGA Tour Latinoamérica and the Tour de las Americas.

Career
Gómez was born in Resistencia, Argentina. He has had three wins on the Tour de las Americas, in addition to three other wins on the Argentine TPG Tour. He placed second at the Chaco Open in 2006, the TLA Players Championship in 2006 and the Venezuela Open in 2007. He won TPG Tour Ranking in 2009.

Gómez won his first Nationwide Tour event at the 2010 Chitimacha Louisiana Open with a six stroke victory over the field which culminated in a final round 64. He finished the year 12th on the money list to earn his 2011 PGA Tour card. In 2011, Gómez played in 26 events with his best finish being a T7 at the Puerto Rico Open, his only top 10 that year. is other best results included a T15 at the St. Jude Classic and a T18 at the Viking Classic on his way to finishing the year 157th on the money list, hence failing to retain his playing privileges.

In 2012, Gómez returned to the Nationwide Tour, where his most notable results were a T2 at the Chitimacha Louisiana Open, T7 at the South Georgia Classic and T10 at the Winn-Dixie Jacksonville Open. He finished the year 55th on the Nationwide Tour money list. At the end of the season, he competed in the PGA Tour Qualifying Tournament where he placed T10 at 21 under par, which was enough to regain his PGA Tour card for the 2013 season.

In 2013, Gómez finished T2 at the Puerto Rico Open, T16 at the RBC Canadian Open and T21 at the AT&T National, but made only 10 cuts out of 23 events on the year. He finished 133rd on the FedEx Cup standings, so he lost his full PGA Tour card and only maintained conditional status.

On the 2014 Web.com Tour, Gómez finished T2 at the Stonebrae Classic, T4 at the United Leasing Championship and T10 at the Albertsons Boise Open. He finished 23rd in the regular season earnings, which earned him a PGA Tour card for the 2015 season.

On 14 June 2015, Gómez broke through and won his first PGA Tour title in his 70th event, at the FedEx St. Jude Classic, winning by four strokes over Greg Owen. He started the final round with the co-lead, alongside Owen, but shot a final round 66, which included five birdies and only one bogey to pull clear of the chasing pack and take the victory. The win moved Gómez up over 150 places in the world rankings to 131st and will ensure that he plays in his first ever major championship at the 2015 PGA Championship.

In January 2016, Gómez won his second PGA Tour title at the Sony Open in Hawaii. He prevailed in a sudden-death playoff over Brandt Snedeker with a birdie on the second extra hole. Gómez had earlier shot a 62 during the final round to come from four behind to make the playoff. It moved Gómez to the cusp of the world's top 50, at 55th and took him one step closer to representing Argentina in the summer Olympics.

Gómez also plays occasionally on PGA Tour Latinoamérica when the tour is in Argentina, where he won the Personal Classic from 2013 to 2015.

Professional wins (16)

PGA Tour wins (2)

PGA Tour playoff record (1–0)

Nationwide Tour wins (1)

Nationwide Tour playoff record (0–1)

Canadian Tour wins (1)

1Co-sanctioned by the Tour de las Américas and the TPG Tour

PGA Tour Latinoamérica wins (3)

*Note: The 2014 Personal Classic was shortened to 54 holes due to weather.

Tour de las Américas wins (4)

1Co-sanctioned by the Canadian Tour
2Co-sanctioned by the TPG Tour

TPG Tour wins (7)

1Co-sanctioned by the Canadian Tour
2Co-sanctioned by the Tour de las Américas

Argentine Tour wins (1)
 2004 Villa Mercedes Grand Prix

Other wins (1)
 2006 Bear Lakes CC Gateway Tour Championship (USA)

Results in major championships
Results not in chronological order in 2020.

CUT = missed the half-way cut
"T" = Tied
NT = No tournament due to COVID-19 pandemic

Results in The Players Championship

CUT = missed the halfway cut
"T" indicates a tie for a place

Results in World Golf Championships

"T" = Tied

Team appearances
Professional
 World Cup (representing Argentina): 2013

See also
2010 Nationwide Tour graduates
2012 PGA Tour Qualifying School graduates
2014 Web.com Tour Finals graduates
2018 Web.com Tour Finals graduates
2019 Korn Ferry Tour Finals graduates

References

External links

Argentine male golfers
PGA Tour Latinoamérica golfers
PGA Tour golfers
Olympic golfers of Argentina
Golfers at the 2016 Summer Olympics
Korn Ferry Tour graduates
Sportspeople from Chaco Province
People from Resistencia, Chaco
1978 births
Living people